The Catholic Church and Judaism have a long and complex history of cooperation and conflict, and have had a strained relationship throughout history, with periods of persecution, violence and discrimination directed towards Jews by Christians, particularly during the Middle Ages.

The Catholic Church, as the largest Christian denomination, traces its roots back to the early Christian community, while Judaism is one of the oldest monotheistic religions and the first of the Abrahamic religions. Christianity started as a movement within Judaism in the mid-1st century. Worshipers of the diverging religions initially co-existed, but began branching out under Paul the Apostle.  In 380, Christianity became the state religion of the Roman Empire, and a power on its own after the Fall of Rome.  As Christianity grew and became the dominant religion in the Roman Empire, the relationship between the two religions began to change with the Catholic Church, which emerged as the main institution of Christianity, starting to view Judaism as a rival religion. In the 4th century, the Roman Emperor Constantine converted to Christianity and made it the state religion. The Church began to suppress the practice of Judaism and forced many Jews to convert to Christianity. This persecution continued for several centuries, with Jews being subjected to forced conversions, expulsions, and massacres.

During the Middle Ages, the Catholic Church institutionalized antisemitism through the creation of discriminatory laws and the establishment of the Inquisition. This led to widespread persecution of Jews, including forced conversions, expulsions, and pogroms. Jews were expelled from Catholic kingdoms, including England and Spain and many of the principalities and cities of the Holy Roman Empire and Italy.

After the Holocaust in the 20th century, the Second Vatican Council in the 1960s led to improvements in the relationship between the Catholic Church and Judaism, following the Church's repudiation of the Jewish deicide accusation and its addressing the topic of antisemitism. In 1965, the Church issued the document "Nostra aetate" which condemned antisemitism and recognized the shared heritage of Jews and Christians. Since the 1970s, interfaith committees have met regularly to address relations between the religions, and Catholic and Jewish institutions have continued to work together on issues such as social justice, interfaith dialogue, and Holocaust education. The Catholic Church has also taken steps to address the harm caused by past persecution of Jews, such as the establishment of the Vatican Commission for Religious Relations with the Jews and the apology of the Pope John Paul II to the Jewish community.

Background 

Christianity started as a movement in Second Temple Judaism in the Roman province of Judea in the mid-1st century. The first Christians were Jewish and the early spread of Christianity was aided by the wide extent of the Jewish diaspora in the Roman Empire. Although Jesus was not accepted as the messiah by Jewish leaders, worshipers of the diverging religions initially co-existed within the Jewish synagogues, reading the Jewish scriptures, singing the Psalms and joining in the various rituals of the Jewish calendar. Christians moved away from Jews in subsequent centuries, but modern Catholicism has retained much of its Hebrew literary heritage, the Old Testament (Tanakh).

Even as pagans and gentiles increasingly began to attend Christian worship, the Jewish framework remained strong. Paul the Apostle initially took part in the Jewish persecution of the early Christian movement, but following his conversion, he became a leading exponent for Christianity branching away from Judaism and becoming a religion open to all, which could move away from strict Jewish dietary laws and the requirement of circumcision. Judaism was recognized as a legal religion by Julius Caesar but the relationship was volatile resulting in several Jewish-Roman wars. Christianity did not receive legal recognition until the 313 Edict of Milan. The reign of the Emperor Constantine elevated Christianity to the preferred religion of the Roman State - while reducing the position of paganism and Judaism, with Christianity becoming the State church of the Roman Empire in 380. The dominance of Christianity was to flourish and outlast the Roman Empire.

Following the Fall of Rome, and during the Middle Ages, the Catholic Church became a temporal power in its own right.

The Black Death

The "Black Death" pandemic swept through Asia and the Middle East and into Europe between 1347 and 1350, and is believed to have killed between a third and two-thirds of Europe's population. Popular opinion blamed the Jews for the plague, and violence directed at them erupted throughout the continent.

In defence of the Jews, Pope Clement VI issued two papal bulls in 1348 (6 July and 26 September), the latter named Quamvis Perfidiam, which condemned the violence and said those who blamed the plague on the Jews had been "seduced by that liar, the Devil." He went on to emphasise that "It cannot be true that the Jews, by such a heinous crime, are the cause or occasion of the plague, because through many parts of the world the same plague, by the hidden judgment of God, has afflicted and afflicts the Jews themselves and many other races who have never lived alongside them." He urged clergy to take action to protect Jews and offered them papal protection in the city of Avignon.

Jewish "perfidy"

A new understanding of the relationship between Catholics and Jews is also reflected in the revised liturgy of Good Friday in a particular way. The pre-1962 version of the Good Friday Prayer of the Roman Rite had Catholics praying that the "perfidis Judaeis" might be converted to "the truth". The English cognate "perfidious" had, over the centuries, gradually acquired the sense of "treacherous". In order to eliminate misunderstanding on this point, Pope Pius XII ordered in 1955 that, in Catholic liturgical books, the Latin word "perfidis" be properly translated "unbelieving", ensuring that the prayer be understood in its original sense: praying for the Jews who remained "unbelieving" concerning the Messiah. Indeed, the same adjective was used in many of the ancient rituals for receiving non-Christian converts into the Catholic Church.

Owing to the enduring potential for confusion and misunderstanding because of the divergence of English usage from the original Latin meaning, Pope John XXIII ordered that the Latin adjective "perfidis" be dropped from the Good Friday prayer for the Jews; in 1960 he ordered it removed from all rituals for the reception of converts. As part of the revision of the Roman Missal, the prayer was completely rewritten. The current prayer of the Roman Liturgy for Good Friday prays for "the Jewish people, first to hear the word of God, that they may continue to grow in the love of His name and in faithfulness to His covenant."

Jewish deicide 
In 1962, Pope John XXIII opened the Second Vatican Council, a pastoral ecumenical council of the Catholic Church. It closed under Pope Paul VI in 1965.  One of the most revolutionary changes that resulted from interpretations of this council's documents concerned the Church's attitude to Jews and Judaism.

Among other things, the Second Vatican Council addressed the charge of Jewish deicide, repudiating the belief in the collective Jewish guilt for the crucifixion of Jesus stating that, even though some Jewish authorities and those who followed them called for Jesus' death, the blame for what happened cannot be laid at the door of all Jews living at that time, nor can the Jews in our time be held guilty. The council issued the declaration Nostra aetate ("In Our Time"), which reads in part:

True, the Jewish authorities and those who followed their lead pressed for the death of Christ; still, what happened in His passion cannot be charged against all the Jews, without distinction, then alive, nor against the Jews of today. The Jews should not be presented as rejected or accursed by God, as if this followed from the Holy Scriptures. All should see to it, then, that in catechetical work or in the preaching of the word of God they do not teach anything that does not conform to the truth of the Gospel and the spirit of Christ.

Antisemitism

Nostra aetate restates the Church attitude to antisemitism, and describes the Church's relationship with Jews as a shared patrimony:

Furthermore, in her rejection of every persecution against any man, the Church, mindful of the patrimony she shares with the Jews and moved not by political reasons but by the Gospel's spiritual love, decries hatred, persecutions, displays of anti-Semitism, directed against Jews at any time and by anyone.

The Church attitude to the mistreatment of Jews is not new, though the experience of the Holocaust brought on an urgency to its renewal. Around 400,  St Augustine, one of the most influential and foundational figures of Catholic theology, preached that the Jews must be protected for their ability to explain the Old Testament. Around 598, in reaction to anti-Jewish attacks by Christians in Palermo, Pope Gregory the Great (c 540–604) brought Augustine's teachings into Roman Law, by writing a Papal Bull which became the foundation of Catholic doctrine in relation to the Jews and specified that, although the Jews had not accepted salvation through Christ, and were therefore condemned by God until such time as they accept salvation, Christians were nevertheless duty-bound to protect the Jews as an important part of Christian civilization. The Bull said that Jews should be treated equitably and justly, that their property rights should be protected, and that they should keep their own festivals and religious practices. Thus, in the Papal States, Jews enjoyed a level of protection in law.

While a "persecuting spirit" often existed among the general population through the Middle Ages, Jewish communities often had to turn to the Holy See for protection. Papal Bulls reiterating the duty of protection were issued by various Popes, Following attacks on Jews by the First Crusade, during which over five thousand Jews were slaughtered in Europe, Pope Callixtus II (c. 1120) issued "Sicut Judaeis", which served as a papal charter of protection to Jews. Following further attacks, the bull was reaffirmed by many popes including Alexander III, Celestine III (1191-1198), Innocent III (1199), Honorius III (1216), Gregory IX (1235), Innocent IV (1246), Alexander IV (1255), Urban IV (1262), Gregory X (1272 & 1274), Nicholas III, Martin IV (1281), Honorius IV (1285-1287), Nicholas IV (1288–92), Clement VI (1348), Urban V (1365), Boniface IX (1389), Martin V (1422), and Nicholas V (1447). The bull forbade Christians, on pain of excommunication, from forcing Jews to convert, from harming them, from taking their property, from disturbing the celebration of their festivals, and from interfering with their cemeteries. After then, the doctrine was maintained in form only, with many anti-Jewish measures being enacted and certain Popes, including Paul IV, oppressed the Jews.

The Second World War and the Holocaust
In the modern world, anti-Jewish sentiment reached its zenith with the murderous racial antisemitism of the Nazi Holocaust. In the aftermath of the defeat of Hitler's Germany, and discovery of the extent of Nazi war crimes, the long history of Christian anti-Judaism came to be critically examined by scholars attempting to explain the origins of the Holocaust. A movement for Christian–Jewish reconciliation grew. According to the historian Geoffrey Blainey, "In the following forty years, Christians and Jews were to come together more closely than at perhaps any other time since the half-century after Christ had died.

Modern Catholic teachings about Judaism 

To further the goal of reconciliation, the Catholic Church in 1971 established an internal International Catholic-Jewish Liaison Committee and the International Jewish Committee for Interreligious Consultations. (This Committee is not a part of the Church's Magisterium.)

On May 4, 2001, at the 17th meeting of the International Liaison Committee in New York, Church officials stated that they would change how Judaism is dealt with in Catholic seminaries and schools. In part, they stated:

The curricula of Catholic seminaries and schools of theology should reflect the central importance of the Church's new understanding of its relationship to Jews. ... Courses on Bible, developments by which both the Church and rabbinic Judaism emerged from early Judaism will establish a substantial foundation for ameliorating "the painful ignorance of the history and traditions of Judaism of which only negative aspects and often caricature seem to form part of the stock ideas of many Christians. (See notes on the "Correct Way to Present Jews and Judaism in Catholic Preaching and Catechesis", #27, 1985)

... Courses dealing with the biblical, historical and theological aspects of relations between Jews and Christians should be an integral part of the seminary and theologate curriculum, and not merely electives. All who graduate from Catholic seminaries and theology schools should have studied the revolution in Catholic teaching on Jews and Judaism from Nostra aetate to the prayer of Pope John Paul II in Jerusalem at the Western Wall on March 26, 2000. ... For historic reasons, many Jews find it difficult to overcome generational memories of anti-Semitic oppression. Therefore: Lay and Religious Jewish leaders need to advocate and promote a program of education in our Jewish schools and seminaries – about the history of Catholic-Jewish relations and knowledge of Christianity and its relationship to Judaism. ... Encouragement of dialogue between the two faiths does involve recognition, understanding and respect for each other's beliefs, without having to accept them. It is particularly important that Jewish schools teach about the Second Vatican Council, and subsequent documents and attitudinal changes that opened new perspectives and possibilities for both faiths.

In October 2015 the Catholic Church in Poland published a letter referring to antisemitism as a sin against the commandment to love one's neighbor. The letter also acknowledged the heroism of those Poles who risked their lives to shelter Jews as Nazi Germany carried out the Holocaust in occupied Poland. The bishops who signed the letter cited the Polish Pope John Paul II who was opposed to antisemitism, and believed in founding Catholic-Jewish relations.

In 2015, the Vatican Commission for Religious Relations with the Jews released a theological reflection that, while rejecting the idea of “two different paths toward salvation, the Jewish path without Christ and the path with the Christ”, and calling on Christians to “bear witness to their faith in Jesus Christ (...) in a humble and sensitive manner” to Jewish people, acknowledged that Jews were “participants in God’s salvation” and that the Church views evangelization to Jews “in a different manner from that to people of other religions and world views”, rejected the principle of an institutional Jewish mission, and called on Catholics to fight anti-Semitism. 

Pope Francis has been considered to be particularly instrumental in furthering Catholic-Jewish relations. During a visit to a synagogue, Francis echoed Pope John Paul II's statement that Jews are the "elder brothers" of Christians, and further stated: "in fact you are our brothers and sisters in the faith. We all belong to one family, the family of God, who accompanies and protects us, His people."

Jewish responses

Orthodox Rabbinic Statement on Christianity

On 3 December 2015, fifty years after the issue of Nostra aetate, the Israel-based Center for Jewish-Christian Understanding and Cooperation (CJCUC) spearheaded a petition of orthodox rabbis from around the world calling for increased partnership between Jews and Christians.
The unprecedented Orthodox Rabbinic Statement on Christianity, entitled "To Do the Will of Our Father in Heaven: Toward a Partnership between Jews and Christians", was initially signed by over 25 prominent Orthodox rabbis in Israel, United States and Europe and now has over 60 signatories.

Between Jerusalem and Rome
On 31 August 2017, representatives of the Conference of European Rabbis, the Rabbinical Council of America, and the Commission of the Chief Rabbinate of Israel issued and presented the Holy See with a statement entitled Between Jerusalem and Rome. The document pays particular tribute to the Second Vatican Council's Declaration Nostra aetate, whose fourth chapter represents the Magna Charta of the Holy See's dialogue with the Jewish world. Between Jerusalem and Rome does not hide the theological differences that exist between the two faith traditions while all the same it expresses a firm resolve to collaborate more closely, now and in the future.

Significant outstanding issues

Pius XII 
Some Jewish groups and historians have said Pope Pius XII, who was Pope from 1939 to 1958, stayed silent during the Holocaust and did not do enough to save lives. They have sought access to Vatican World War II era  archives to determine whether or not Pope Pius XII did enough to help Jews before or during the war, or whether he held some sympathy for the Nazi regime. The Vatican has until 2020 maintained a policy of allowing only partial access to the archives.

Jewish groups and historians have argued for years that the Vatican should not move forward with Pius' beatification until the Vatican's full wartime archives were opened.

On 2 March 2020, the Vatican opened to historians its archives relating to Pope Pius XII.

The Church's repentance 

In addition, although the Jewish community appreciated John Paul II's 1994 statement, We Remember: A Reflection on the Shoah, which offered a mea culpa for the role of Christians in the Holocaust, some Jewish groups felt that the statement was insufficient, as it focused on individual members of the Church who helped the Nazis, portraying them as acting against the teachings of the Church.

Some critics consider the statement irresponsible, because it absolved the Church of any blame.  Lingering disputes also remain about some of the practical aftereffects of the Holocaust, including the question of how to deal with Jewish children who were baptized during the Second World War and were never returned to their Jewish families and people.

Traditionalist Catholics

Traditionalist Catholics who are particularly devoted to the ancient traditions of the Church, and reject many of the changes made since Vatican II, or regard it as an invalid Council, view interfaith dialogue with Jews as unnecessary and potentially leading to a "watering-down" of the Catholic faith. In the view of some traditionalist Catholics, Jews are believed to be damned unless they convert.

Arab Catholics 

Continuing tensions in the Middle East impacts on relations between Jews and Catholics in the region and beyond. Relations with Arab Christians in Lebanon, Jordan and Syria often parallel those relations with Arab Muslims and remain difficult, especially with regards to the question of anti-zionism and Zionism.

The media's treatment of the Church 
In a May 2002 interview with the Italian-Catholic publication 30 Giorni, Honduran Cardinal Oscar Maradiaga claimed that Jews influenced the media to exploit the recent controversy regarding sexual abuse by Catholic priests in order to divert attention from the Israeli-Palestinian crisis. This provoked outrage from the Anti-Defamation League, especially since Maradiaga has a reputation as a moderate and that he is regarded as a papabile. The high-profile Don Pierino Gelmini of Italy, himself personally accused of sexually abusing a number of young men, put the blame on a nebulous "Jewish radical chic" in an interview with the Corriere della Sera. He later apologized and shifted the blame onto the Freemasons. The bishop Giacomo Babini described the scandal's exposure as a refined "Zionist attack" in an April 2010 newspaper interview.

Catholics in Israel

The legal system provides for freedom of religion in Israel, and the state recognizes non-Jewish minority religious communities, including Catholics, and allocates funding for the provision of the religious needs of their members. However, in comparison to funding for Orthodox Jewish requirements, minority religious communities do not receive a proportional allocation, in what is viewed as discrimination against these minorities. Recognized religious communities, including Catholics, are granted official status and authority, notably in matters of marriage, burial, and divorce.

Despite legal protections for religious minorities, there have been incidents of anti-Christian attacks, including spitting,  and so-called "price tag" attacks by violent Jewish extremists vandalizing and damaging Christian property, notably in  2012, at  the Catholic monastery at Latrun and the entrance to the Church of the Dormition on Mount Zion, in 2013 at a Catholic abbey, and in 2014, an  attack at the Notre Dame of Jerusalem Center, the local headquarters of the Catholic Church. 

The Catholic Church of the Multiplication of the Loaves and Fish at Tabgha, in northern Israel was damaged by arson in 2015 and sixteen yeshiva students were arrested over suspected involvement in the religiously motivated attack.

Intermarriage
Pope Francis' Amoris laetitia or The Joy of Love, addresses the issue of interfaith marriages. While marriages of Catholics to non-Catholics are viewed as "mixed marriages", Francis calls marriages to non-Christians, including Jews, "a privileged place for inter religious dialogue." Piero Stefani, a scholar at the Facoltà Teologica del Nord Italia, a Church-owned institute, noted, "The Church is no longer endorsing a policy of missionary conversion, especially toward Jews. So interfaith marriages are seen as an 'opportunity' to start a positive dialogue [about faith] with the non-Catholic spouse, rather than an occasion to convert him or her." Francis has frequently stated that Catholics should not try to convert Jews.

Intermarriage of Jews is rare in Israel and among the Orthodox. In the U.S., Jewish intermarriage is common, and those who do intermarry with someone of a different religion are more likely to marry a Catholic than a mainline Protestant.

See also 
 Antisemitism in Christianity
 Catholic Church and Islam
 Christianity and Judaism
 Christian–Jewish reconciliation
 Christian Zionism
 Holy See–Israel relations
 Interfaith dialogue
 Judaism and Mormonism
 Jules Isaac
 Pope John XXIII and Judaism
 Pope John Paul II and Judaism
 Protestantism and Judaism
 Relations between the Orthodox Church and Judaism

References

Bibliography
 Ain, Stewart. "Staying The Course: John Paul II built a closeness between the Vatican and Jewish community, and Jewish leaders don't expect that to change", The Jewish Week, April 8, 2005
 Lipman, Steve. "The Jewish Critique: Amid the pope's remarkable record on the Jews, issues linger", The Jewish Week, April 8, 2005

External links 
 Vatican.va:Commission of the Holy See for Religious Relations with the Jews
Staying The Course: John Paul II built a closeness between the Vatican and Jewish community, and Jewish leaders don't expect that to change
 Catholic Encyclopedia Article on Judaism. Of particular interest is section four:  "Judaism and Church Legislation". (The Catholic Encyclopedia was written before Vatican II, and may reflect attitudes that no longer characterize the Catholic view of Judaism.)
 Timeline - Pope Benedict angers Jews – a timeline of recent events in Catholic-Jewish relations (Reuters, January 25, 2009)

 
History of the Catholic Church